Da Yie (also known by its English title Good Night) is a 2019 short film directed by Anthony Nti.

In 2020, it won the Clermont-Ferrand International Short Film Festival and was amongst the finalists for the BAFTA Los Angeles Student Film Awards.

Da Yie film was produced by Anthony Nti, Chingiz Karibekov and Dimitri Verbeek, and distributed worldwide by the International Production & Distribution company Salaud Morisset.

Plot 

Young Matilda and Prince are taken on a life-changing trip by a stranger. Kids, gangsters and Ghana's vibrant coast as you've never seen them.

Awards 
Since its launch, the film has been selected in more than 130 festivals around the world. In February 2021, it made the Live Action Short Film shortlist for the 93rd Academy Awards.

References

External links 
 
Da Yie (Full Film) on Vimeo

2019 films
Belgian short films
2019 short films